Calvin B. Ball III (born September 2, 1975) is an American Democratic politician who serves as the county executive of Howard County, Maryland. He is the first African-American to hold this office. On Thursday, November 9, 2017, Ball announced his candidacy for County Executive for the 2018 Election. On November 7, 2018, Ball  defeated incumbent Republican Allan Kittleman. He was sworn in as the new County Executive on December 3, 2018.

Prior to his County Executive position, he served as a Council Member of the 2nd District of Howard County, Maryland from April 2006 through December 2018. On December 4, 2006, Ball made Howard County history when he was elected the youngest Chairperson ever to lead the County Council, serving approximately 50,000 constituents.  On December 6, 2010, he was unanimously elected to serve his second term as Chairperson of the County Council, and again on December 2, 2014, he was elected to his third term as Chairperson.

Ball serves as the Second Vice President of the Maryland Association of Counties (MACo). He has also served on the executive board as treasurer of the organization. As a Council member, he founded the Diversity caucus, the first statewide caucus for County elected officials of color. MACo is a non-profit and non-partisan organization serving Maryland's 23 counties and Baltimore City.

Early life and education
Ball was born in Catonsville, Maryland, and earned a Bachelor of Arts in Philosophy and Religion from Towson State University, a Master of Arts in Legal and Ethical Studies from the University of Baltimore (where he was nominated for the Spirit of Excellence Award), and a Doctor of Education from Morgan State University. He is also a member of Kappa Delta Pi, an honor society in education and Alpha Phi Alpha fraternity.

As a resident of Columbia, Maryland, Ball served as a Howard County Firefighter and Emergency Medical Technician. Additionally, he served three terms on the Oakland Mills Village Board and was a Community Organizer in Howard County, where he facilitated neighborhood revitalization. Ball was also a member of the Howard County Chamber of Commerce's Educator of the Year Committee and Chamber's Workforce Readiness Committee; as well as the Howard County Public School System Leadership Task Force and Student Performance Review Committee.

Ball has worked as a mediator for the Community Mediation Program and the Maryland State Human Relations Commission. He also served as a mediation supervisor for the Maryland Office of the Attorney General.

Personal life 
Ball resides in the Village of Oakland Mills and is married to Shani D. Ball, R.N., B.S.N. They have two daughters.

Howard County Council
In April 2006, Ball was appointed to fill a vacancy on the Howard County Council to represent the 2nd Councilmanic District of Howard County. Ball retained the seat in the November election. He has been an active Democrat, serving two terms as President of the Young Democrats of Howard County.

In 2014, then-Councilman Ball initiated legislation that created nutritional guidelines for food and drinks sold in government vending machines. The legislation required that 75 percent of food dispensed from vending machines meet minimum nutritional standards.

In 2016, then-Council Chairman Ball led negotiations with the Howard Hughes Corporation for a project aimed at overhauling Downtown Columbia. The plan centered around further public development as well as funding for a new elementary school.

Howard County Executive
On November 7, 2018, Ball was elected as the first African American County Executive in Howard County history. On December 3, 2018, Ball was sworn into office, becoming the 10th Howard County Executive.

Environment 
During his tenure, Ball committed Howard County to following the tenants of the Paris Climate Accords.

In 2020, Ball proposed forest conservation legislation aimed at mitigating the loss of natural lands.

Ellicott City 
In December 2018, Ball Launched his "Safe and Sound" plan to address flooding in Ellicott City, improve public safety, and support local businesses. As part of his announcement, Ball announced several initiatives aimed at protecting public safety, including an outdoor tone alert system and a program to clean the waterways in and around Ellicott City more frequently. In April 2019, Ball presented five possible flood mitigation plans to the public and solicited public feedback on the plans. In May 2019, County Executive Ball selected a flood mitigation plan to spend between $113 million to $140 million on Ellicott City flood mitigation, a decision that earned the endorsement of The Baltimore Sun editorial board. In March 2020, Howard County announced that the U.S. Army Corps of Engineers had completed a review of the flood mitigation plan and found that the county was following a sound process, and that the selected plan should reduce flooding concerns in Ellicott City.

Controversies 

In 2019, the Howard County Ethics Commission initiated an investigation into allegations of wrongdoing related to improper use of the "county seal for political gain". According to The Baltimore Sun,"At issue is a 2015 video posted to Ball’s political Facebook page in which the then-county councilman explains his commitment to the Democratic Party while standing in front of the Howard County seal in a hearing room in the George Howard Building in Ellicott City. A county law passed in 2004 makes it illegal for government officials to use the county seal for "any political purpose" including, but not limited to, mailers and handouts."

Election history

References

External links
 
 
 

1975 births
African-American people in Maryland politics
Living people
County commissioners in Maryland
Howard County Executives
People from Catonsville, Maryland
Towson University alumni
21st-century African-American politicians
21st-century American politicians